Michel Sanchez (born 1 July 1957 in Somain, France) is a French musician. He spent much of this youth studying music (piano, classical organ percussion). Sanchez is the co-founder of the band Deep Forest along with Éric Mouquet. He won a Grammy Award in 1995, and a World Award for best world music album. During the early 1990s, Sanchez mixed electronic music with a traditional song from the Solomon Islands, to combine what is called Deep Forest.

Discography

As a member of Deep Forest

 1992 – Deep Forest (over 3 million album sales)
 1994 – World Mix (re-release of 1992 album)
 1995 – Boheme (over 4 million album sales)
 1998 – Comparsa (over 1 million album sales)
 1999 – Made in Japan (live album, 150,000 copies sold)
 2000 – Pacifique (soundtrack album)
 2002 – Music Detected
 2003 – Essence of Deep Forest (best of, released only in Japan)
 2004 – Essence of the Forest (best of, three different editions)
 2004 – Kusa no Ran (soundtrack album, released only in Japan)

Solo albums
 1994 – Windows
 1997 – Welenga (with Wes Madiko)
 2000 – Hieroglyphes
 2008 – The Touch
 2008 – The Day of a Paper Bird
 2014 – Eliott
 2015 – The Man and the Machine
 2016 – Ca Sent L'Jazz
 2016 – Windows II

External links 
 Michel Sanchez

1957 births
Living people
French musicians
People from Somain, Nord
French keyboardists